Mecigestone, also known as pentarane B, as well as 6α-methyl-16α,17α-cyclohexanoprogesterone, 6α-methylcyclohexano[1',2';16,17]pregn-4-ene-3,20-dione, or 17α-acetyl-6α-methyl-16β,24-cyclo-21-norchol-4-en-3-one, is a steroidal progestin that was developed by the Zelinskii Institute of Organic Chemistry of the Russian Academy of Sciences and has been proposed for clinical use as a progestogen but has not been marketed. It is the 6α-methylated analogue of pentarane A, which is also known as D'6-pentarane or pregna-D'6-pentarane.

See also
 Acetomepregenol

References

Enones
Pregnanes
Progestogens
Russian drugs